Daniele Dalla Bona (born 12 August 1983) is an Italian professional footballer who plays mainly as a midfielder.

Club career
On 27 December 2019 he returned to Giana Erminio, signing a contract until the end of the 2019–20 season.

References

External links 
 
 

1983 births
Living people
Sportspeople from Varese
Footballers from Lombardy
Association football midfielders
Italian footballers
Serie B players
Serie C players
Serie D players
S.S.D. Varese Calcio players
A.S.D. La Biellese players
F.C. Pro Vercelli 1892 players
Casale F.B.C. players
U.S. Massese 1919 players
Aurora Pro Patria 1919 players
A.S. Cittadella players
Modena F.C. players
Real Vicenza V.S. players
Mantova 1911 players
U.C. AlbinoLeffe players
Santarcangelo Calcio players
A.S. Giana Erminio players
S.S. Fidelis Andria 1928 players